Chenaran-e Yek (also Romanized as Chenārān-e Yek; also known as Chenārān) is a village in Soghan Rural District, Soghan District, Arzuiyeh County, Kerman Province, Iran. At the 2006 census, its population was 20, in 4 families.

References 

Populated places in Arzuiyeh County